The Nanticoke Refinery is an oil refinery in Nanticoke, Ontario, Canada.  It is owned and operated by Imperial Oil, which is majority owned by ExxonMobil. The refuels primarily go to Esso-branded gas stations in Canada and to other oil companies' distribution networks in Canada and the United States.

History
Nanticoke refinery was originally built by Texaco Canada on the site of the former RCAF Station Jarvis. It started production on November 17, 1978. In 1987, the refinery went through modifications to improve efficiency. Imperial Oil became an owner of the refinery when it purchased Texaco's Canadian assets in 1989.

In 2004, a new gasoline hydrofining unit was built to treat gasoline ingredients from the Nanticoke and Sarnia refineries, followed by the second unit in 2006. A new desulphurization unit was commissioned in 2006. 

In February 2007, a combination of a fire at the Nanticoke refinery and a strike at CN resulted in a shortage of gasoline at Esso stations in Ontario, which also drove up prices to more than a dollar a litre. Strangely, the fire had been discovered quickly but the fire suppression systems were not operating, and the handheld fire extinguishers had a faulty charge.  Damage to the facility was made inevitable when the on-site fire brigade ran out of gas while en route to the location.

See also
 Oakville Refinery

References

External links
 Nanticoke refinery (Imperial Oil website)

1978 establishments in Ontario
Oil refineries in Canada
ExxonMobil buildings and structures
Buildings and structures in Haldimand County
Energy infrastructure completed in 1978